The Little Thompson River is a tributary of the Big Thompson River and thence the South Platte River in the U.S. state of Colorado.

The river's headwaters lie in the Roosevelt National Forest.  It flows east through the foothills of the Rocky Mountains in Larimer County through the town of Berthoud, Colorado, between Longmont to the south and Loveland to the north.  The Little Thompson joins the Big Thompson River near that river's confluence with the South Platte River, near the town of Milliken, Colorado.

Its run includes at least one  waterfall and numerous granite box canyons. The river had no man-made dams as of 2007. It is managed as part of the Colorado-Big Thompson project.

The river is considered a Class IV+ waterway, marginally navigable by experienced kayakers, and then only when it is in flood stage during the rainy Spring season.

The most numerous fish species observed in the river include brook trout, mountain whitefish, rainbow trout, native Greenback cutthroat trout, and sculpin.

On May 8, 2016, two boys, Paul and Daniel Foreman, drowned in a part of the river known as 'The Tubs' near Pinewood Springs. The boys, ten and seven, respectively, were playing in the river when they were swept away.

See also
 List of rivers of Colorado

References

External links
 Southwest Paddler website's kayaking/canoeing review of the Little Thompson River

Rivers of Colorado
Tributaries of the Platte River
Rivers of Larimer County, Colorado
Rivers of Weld County, Colorado